Carmel is an unincorporated community in Shenandoah County, Virginia, United States. Carmel lies within Fort Valley at the crossroads of Virginia Secondary Route 678 (Fort Valley Road) and Oak Tree Road.

References

Unincorporated communities in Shenandoah County, Virginia
Unincorporated communities in Virginia